Earth Day Live was a three-day livestream commemorating the 50th anniversary of Earth Day in the United States. The event was streamed online as part of efforts to promote social distancing during the COVID-19 pandemic. It is being referred to as the largest online mass mobilization in history.

Planning 
The event ran from 9 a.m. to 9 p.m. ET on April 22, 23, and 24th. The event was organized by youth climate activists, and featured Joaquin Phoenix, Moby, Patricia Arquette, Jane Fonda, Robby Romero, Al Gore, Stacey Abrams in conversation with Climate change activists, scientists, and journalists. The event also featured performances from musicians such as Jason Mraz, Angélique Kidjo, Emily Wells, Aimee Mann, Ted Leo, Jack Johnson, Questlove, Talib Kweli, among others.

Themes & Goals 
Future Coalition executive director Katie Eder, who heads up the nine youth-led organizations that coordinated the event, said that Earth Day activism had to be rethought due to technological advances in modern times. “It’s a time to really rethink our strategy, we are really looking at this as a way to reimagine what a social movement can look like in a digital age.” said Katie Eder.The event focussed not only on climate change and environment like the traditional Earth Day, but also on society's ability to combat the effects of climate change, such as the COVID-19 Epidemic.“It’s not just about the environment and the climate,” “It’s also about building a society and an economy that’s going to take care of the people who’ve been affected by this crisis, the people who are on the front lines of this crisis, whether that’s through health care efforts or economic efforts.” said Naina Agrawal-Hardin, of the Sunrise Movement, one of nine youth led organizations who organized the event.

References 

Climate change films
April 2020 events in the United States
Films about the COVID-19 pandemic
Cultural responses to the COVID-19 pandemic
Environmental films
Earth Day